Lankinen (Langinen) is a Finnish surname. Notable people with the surname include:

Kevin Lankinen, Finnish ice hockey player
Leo Lankinen, Karelian sculptor and artist
Mikko Lankinen, Finnish musician
, Finnish statesman, Undersecretary of State

Finnish-language surnames